"The Dollar" is the debut single by American country music artist Jamey Johnson. It was released in August 2005 and is the title track of his debut album The Dollar. The song reached number 14 on the Billboard Hot Country Singles chart in early 2006, and was the only charting single from the album.

Background and writing
Johnson was inspired to write the song after taking a job as a construction worker, thus causing him to be away from his own young daughter for two months.

Content
The song is a mid-tempo composition accompanied largely by acoustic guitar and steel guitar. Its central character is a child who, upon seeing his father leaving for work, asks his mother why the father has to go to work. The mother then explains that, at work, they "pay him for his time", thus encouraging the boy to gather a dollar's worth of coins from his personal collection, in an attempt to buy some time from his father. After the young boy in the song has gathered his money, the mother calls up the father, telling him that he "[doesn't] have to chase that dollar" because the son "has one here at home".

Chart performance
"The Dollar" debuted at number 50 on Billboards Hot Country Songs chart for the chart week of September 3, 2005. The single reached its peak of number 14 for the week of March 14, 2006, where it stayed there for two consecutive weeks.

References

2005 songs
2005 debut singles
Jamey Johnson songs
Songs written by Jamey Johnson
Song recordings produced by Buddy Cannon
Music videos directed by Wes Edwards
BNA Records singles
Songs about fathers